Culinary Arts Academy Switzerland is a culinary school located in Switzerland and a member school of Swiss Education Group.

Bachelor students are based at the Le Bouveret campus in French-speaking Switzerland, on the shores of Lake Geneva. Master's students, as well as the Chocolate and Pastry Specialisation students, are based at the city campus of Lucerne, in German-speaking Switzerland.

Le Bouveret campus also houses the Mosimann Collection, a collection of culinary memorabilia provided by Chef Anton Mosimann, OBE.

Academic Programmes 
For Undergraduate students, a dual bachelor's degree in Culinary Arts is offered in partnership with University of Derby, U.K. The programme also includes 2 internships, allowing students to gain a year's work experience during their studies.

Postgraduate students can undertake a Master of International Business in Culinary Management. This is a professional master's and includes 2 internships and 2 one-week field trips to the Ritz Escoffier School in Paris.

For Chocolate and Pastry students, an Advanced Professional Diploma in Swiss Pastry and Chocolate Arts is available.

History
Culinary Arts Academy was founded in 1991 and the following year, Domino Carlton Tivoli International Hotel Management Career Centre, as the school was first known, welcomed its first students to its campus in Lucerne's Carlton-Tivoli Hotel building overlooking the shores of Lake Lucerne. In this location, the school grew and developed in its first years, establishing initial relationships with both Johnson & Wales University and Lynn University.

In 1996, DCT International Hotel & Business Management School was formed when a group of the original Swiss founders formed a partnership to take over from its original investors. DCT also expanded its programme offerings, adding courses specialising in European Gourmet Cuisine and in European Pastry and Chocolate to the initial Diploma and Postgraduate Diploma programmes in Hotel & Tourism Management, as well as establishing partnerships with Florida International University and the University of Massachusetts - Amherst.

In 2003, DCT moved its campus out of the 100-year-old Carlton-Tivoli Hotel building and further along the shores of Lake Lucerne to the village of Vitznau. In this setting, DCT continued to develop and grow, including the addition of an MBA in Hospitality Management program and the new Master Gourmet Culinary Arts course, plus an expanded relationship with Lynn University and its Switzerland Program.

In 2011, Swiss Education Group [1] acquired DCT University Center. DCT University Center was renamed to Culinary Arts Academy Switzerland and its two campuses are shared with another Swiss Education Groups school, César Ritz Colleges Switzerland.

In 2012, the campus moved to downtown Lucerne – back to the centre of the city where the school was founded more than two decades earlier. The César Ritz Colleges/Culinary Arts Academy campus is now housed in modern facilities in Lucerne near Löwenplatz, bordering the city's historical and central shopping districts.

Partnerships & Accreditations 
Industry Partnerships include:

Ritz Paris

Ritz Escoffier Culinary School

Mane

Alessi

Academic Partnerships include:

University of Derby (at Undergraduate level)

THE-ICE – The International Centre of Excellence in Tourism and Hospitality Education

EduQua – the Swiss national quality assurance body

References

Hospitality schools in Switzerland
Education in Lucerne